The 1995–96 Arkansas Razorbacks men's basketball team represented the University of Arkansas in the 1995–96 college basketball season. The head coach was Nolan Richardson, serving for his 11th year. The team played its home games in Bud Walton Arena in Fayetteville, Arkansas.

Rankings

Roster

References

Arkansas
Arkansas Razorbacks men's basketball seasons
Arkansas
Razor
Razor